Panophonic is a solo project by Tom Lugo, the front man of the band Stellarscope. The music incorporates lo-fi electro dreampop and shoegaze.

Panophonic has appeared on tribute albums, including Jesusland (a tribute to the Jesus and Mary Chain) and Blue Skyed and Clear (a tribute to Slowdive). It has been featured on the television channels MTV, SyFy, A&E and Discovery.

Discography

Studio albums, Demos, EPs
untouched in ages EP- 2008 Patetico Recordings
one full manic episode- 2007 Patetico Recordings
alumbra- 2007 Patetico Recordings
claroscuro- 2006 Patetico Recordings
despues de la tormenta electrica-2006 Patetico Recordings
todo es azul: lo mejor de mi- 2006 Patetico Recordings
viaje celestial- 2005 Patetico Recordings
ciudad area- 2005 Patetico Recordings
cronicas del silencio- 2004 Patetico Recordings
omni-directional- 2003 Patetico Recordings
fear of noise & other shrieking sounds-2002 Patetico Recordings

Compilations and tributes
 Blue Skyed & Clear for Slowdive Tribute Compilation - So Soft Records (Spain)
Jesusland: A tribute to the Jesus & Mary Chain - Fuga Discos (Argentina)
 Supple Selections V.2 - Supple Records  (USA)

References
 Official website
 Official Myspace
Patetico Recordings website
 Sonido Obscuro review
  Stillborn Magazine review
Panophonic- The Top of The Pop 2008- Sing Sing Journal

Musical groups established in 1998
American psychedelic rock music groups